A submarine power cable is a transmission cable for carrying electric power below the surface of the water. These are called "submarine" because they usually carry electric power beneath salt water (arms of the ocean, seas, straits, etc.) but it is also possible to use submarine power cables beneath fresh water (large lakes and rivers). Examples of the latter exist that connect the mainland with large islands in the St. Lawrence River.

Design technologies

The purpose of submarine power cables is the transport of electric current at high voltage. The electric core is a concentric assembly of inner conductor, electric insulation and protective layers (resembling the design of a coaxial cable). Modern three-core cables (e.g. for the connection of offshore wind turbines) often carry optical fibers for data transmission or temperature measurement, in addition to the electrical conductors.

Conductor
The conductor is made from copper or aluminum wires, the latter material having a small but increasing market share. Conductor sizes ≤ 1200 mm2 are most common, but sizes ≥ 2400 mm2 have been made occasionally. For voltages ≥ 12 kV the conductors are round, so that the insulation is exposed to a uniform electric field gradient. The conductor can be stranded from individual round wires, or can be a single solid wire. In some designs, profiled wires (keystone wires) are laid up to form a round conductor with very small interstices between the wires.

Insulation
Three different types of electric insulation around the conductor are mainly used today.
Cross-linked polyethylene (XLPE) is used up to 420 kV system voltage. It is produced by extrusion, with an insulation thickness of up to about 30 mm;  36 kV class cables have only 5.5 – 8 mm insulation thickness. Certain formulations of XLPE insulation can also be used for DC.
Low-pressure oil-filled cables have an insulation lapped from paper strips. The entire cable core is impregnated with a low-viscosity insulation fluid (mineral oil or synthetic). A central oil channel in the conductor facilitates oil flow in cables up to 525 kV for when the cable gets warm but rarely used in submarine cables due to oil pollution risk with cable damage.
Mass-impregnated cables have also a paper-lapped insulation but the impregnation compound is highly viscous and does not exit when the cable is damaged. Mass-impregnated insulation can be used for massive HVDC cables up to 525 kV.

Armoring
Cables ≥ 52 kV are equipped with an extruded lead sheath to prevent water intrusion. No other materials have been accepted so far. The lead alloy is extruded onto the insulation in long lengths (over 50 km is possible). 
In this stage the product is called cable core. In single-core cables the core is surrounded by a concentric armoring. In three-core cables, three cable cores are laid-up in a spiral configuration before the armoring is applied.
The armoring consists most often of steel wires, soaked in bitumen for corrosion protection. Since the alternating magnetic field in AC cables causes losses in the armoring those cables are sometimes equipped with non-magnetic metallic materials (stainless steel, copper, brass).

AC or DC 

Most electrical power transmission systems use alternating current (AC), because transformers can easily change voltages as needed. High-voltage direct current transmission requires a converter at each end of a direct current line to interface to an alternating current grid. A system using submarine power cables may be less costly overall if using high-voltage direct current transmission, especially on a long link where the capacitance of the cable would require too much additional charging current.  The inner and outer conductors of a cable form the plates of a capacitor, and if the cable is long (on the order of tens of kilometres), the current that flows through this capacitance may be significant compared to the load current. This would require larger, therefore more costly, conductors for a given quantity of usable power to be transmitted.

Operational submarine power cables

Alternating current cables
Alternating-current (AC) submarine cable systems for transmitting lower amounts of three-phase electric power can be constructed with three-core cables in which all three insulated conductors are placed into a single underwater cable. Most offshore-to-shore wind-farm cables are constructed this way.

For larger amounts of transmitted power, the AC systems are composed of three separate single-core underwater cables, each containing just one insulated conductor and carrying one phase of the three phase electric current. A fourth identical cable is often added in parallel with the other three, simply as a spare in case one of the three primary cables is damaged and needs to be replaced. This damage can happen, for example, from a ship's anchor carelessly dropped onto it. The fourth cable can substitute for any one of the other three, given the proper electrical switching system.

Direct current cables

Submarine power cables under construction
 Atlantic Wind Connection between Delaware and New Jersey, potentially between Virginia and New York
 500 MW capacity, 165 km DC Maritime Transmission Link between the Canadian province of Newfoundland and Labrador and the province of Nova Scotia.
 On February 1, 2016 Danish and Dutch operators (Energinet.dk and TenneT) awarded construction contracts to Siemens and Prysmian for COBRAcable, a 294 km submarine cable to provide the two countries with 700 MW transmission at 320 kV DC starting in 2019.
 Norwegian and German power companies have built NORD.LINK, a submarine cable transmitting up to 1,400 MW between the two countries by 2018. As of 2021, it is in testing.
 British and Danish power companies (National Grid and Energinet.dk, respectively) are building Viking Link, a 740 km cable to provide the two countries with 1,400 MW transmission by 2022.
Black Sea submarine electric cable with capacity of 1 GW and voltage of 500 kV will transfer green electricity from Azerbaijan through Georgia, Romania, Moldova to the EU. It is estimated to be approximately 1100 km in length and to be built in late 2029.

Proposed submarine power cables

 Australia–ASEAN Power Link (AAPL), or the Australia–Singapore Power Link (ASPL), is a proposed electricity infrastructure project that is planned to include the world's longest submarine power cable. A solar farm in Northern Territory, Australia, will produce 10 gigawatts of electricity, most of which will be exported to Singapore by a 4,500 km (2,800 mi) 3 GW HVDC transmission line.
 EuroAsia Interconnector, a 1,520 km submarine power cable, reaching depths of up to  under sea level, with the capacity to transmit 2,000 megawatts of electricity connecting Asia and Europe (Israel–Cyprus–Greece)
 Champlain Hudson Power Express, 335-mile line. The Transmission Developers Company of Toronto, Ontario, is proposing "to use the Hudson River for the most ambitious underwater transmission project yet. Beginning south of Montreal, a 335-mile line would run along the bottom of Lake Champlain, and then down the bed of the Hudson all the way to New York City."
 Power Bridge, Hawaii
 Power Bridge, State of Maine
 Puerto Rico to the Virgin Islands
 400 kV HVDC India to Sri Lanka
 220 kV HVAC, 225 megawatts, 117 km Malta–Sicily interconnector between Magħtab, Malta, and Ragusa, Sicily.
 The 58.9-km, 161-kV Taiwan Island to the Penghu Islands submarine power cable system (T–P-cable), the first submarine project of the Taiwan Power Company (Taipower) at this level, scheduled for completion in 2014. On 24 December 2010, the Taiwan-Penghu Undersea Cable Project of Taipower was approved to connect the electrical grid in Taiwan Island to the Penghu Islands.
 The British and Icelandic Governments are supposedly in "active discussion" to build a cable (Icelink) between Scotland and Iceland to carry geothermal power to Scotland. It would be 1,000 to 1,500 km long "and by far the longest in the world." assuming a longer cable not yet built like the proposed 4,200 km Australia–Singapore cable
 FAB between Great Britain and France via Alderney Island in the Channel Islands.
 EuroAfrica Interconnector, a 1,707 km submarine power cable, reaching depths of up to  under sea level, with the capacity to transmit 2,000 megawatts of electricity connecting Africa and Europe (Egypt–Cyprus–Greece)
 11 kV submarine replacement cables connecting Liu Ko Ngam and Pak Sha Tau Tsui at Kat O, Northeast Hong Kong, approximately 880 m in length.

See also
Cable landing point
 Electric power transmission
 Single-wire earth return
 List of HVDC projects
 List of high voltage underground and submarine cables
 Electrical interconnector, e.g. between grids

References

External links
 Subsea Cables UK - An organisation of submarine cable owners, operators and suppliers aimed at promoting marine safety and protecting cable installations on the UK continental shelf
 The International Cable Protection Committee
 Subsea Cables UK article on Submarine Power Cables
 Export cables from Offshore Wind farms to Offshore substations
 Transmission cables from Offshore converter to shore
 History of the Atlantic Cable & Undersea Communications—Power Cables (Cross sections of historic power cables)

 
Electric power transmission

de:Seekabel#Gleichstromkabel